Frank Monroe may refer to:

Frank Monroe (baseball) (1855–1908), Major League Baseball player
Frank A. Monroe (1844–1927), Chief Justice of the Louisiana Supreme Court

See also
Frank Munro (1947–2011), Scottish international footballer
Frank Munro (Australian footballer) (1934–2011), Australian rules footballer
Frank Monroe Clark (1915–2003), U.S. congressman from Pennsylvania
Frank Monroe Hawks (1897-1938), U.S. Army pilot in World War I
Frank Monroe Upton (1896–1962), U.S. Navy sailor